Maspi Rural District is a rural district (dehestan) in the Central District of Abdanan County, Ilam Province, Iran. At the 2006 census, its population was 2,727, in 515 families.  The rural district has 9 villages.

References 

Rural Districts of Ilam Province
Abdanan County